TT & Donut is a 2017 Burmese-Thai romantic comedy drama film, directed by Thai director Adsajun Sattagovit starring Burmese actor Pyay Ti Oo and Thai actress Chattarika Sittiprom. The film was shot a joint venture between Myanmar and Thailand; produced by Golden Princess Film production premiered in Myanmar on January 6, 2017.

Cast
Pyay Ti Oo as TT, Ti Oo
Chattarika Sittiprom as Donut
Suphawit Muongmee
Shwe Thamee
Chai Khunsriluxsa

References

External links

2017 films
2010s Burmese-language films
Thai-language films
2017 multilingual films
Burmese multilingual films
Thai multilingual films
Films shot in Thailand